Cząstków may refer to the following places:
Cząstków, Konin County in Greater Poland Voivodeship (west-central Poland)
Cząstków, Koło County in Greater Poland Voivodeship (west-central Poland)
Cząstków, Świętokrzyskie Voivodeship (south-central Poland)